Muriel's Wedding the Musical is an Australian stage musical, based on the 1994 film of the same name. It has a book by P.J. Hogan (the original film's writer and director), and music and lyrics by Kate Miller-Heidke and Keir Nuttall, with additional songs originally written for ABBA by Benny Andersson, Björn Ulvaeus and Stig Anderson.

Productions

Sydney (2017–2018) 
The original production began previews from 6 November 2017 with an official opening on 18 November 2017, and ran until 27 January 2018 at the Roslyn Packer Theatre in Sydney, produced by Sydney Theatre Company and Global Creatures. Simon Phillips directed, and Gabriela Tylesova designed the set and costumes. The 28-person cast included Maggie McKenna in the title role, Justine Clarke (Muriel's mother, Betty), Gary Sweet (Muriel's father, Bill Heslop), Madeleine Jones (Rhonda), Helen Dallimore (Deidre Chambers), Christie Whelan Browne (Tania Degano), Briallen Clarke (Joanie), Michael Whalley (Perry), Connor Sweeney (Malcolm), Ben Bennett (Brice Nobes) and Stephen Madsen (Alexander Shkuratov).

In 2017 it was announced that the Sydney production (and cast) were going to be transferring to Toronto's Ed Mirvish Theatre, in April 2018. However, the North American premiere was later postponed due to "scheduling conflicts", with producer David Mirvish planning to stage the show in a subsequent season.

Australian tour (2019) 
The musical embarked national tour beginning 12 March 2019 at Her Majesty's Theatre in Melbourne. The production then opened at the Sydney Lyric Theatre on 28 June and was followed by the Queensland Performing Arts Centre in Brisbane from 19 September.

With McKenna performing in the Dear Evan Hansen US tour and Jones joining the Melbourne cast of Harry Potter and the Cursed Child, casting began in September 2018 for two new female leads. On 7 October it was announced that Natalie Abbott would be making her professional debut as Muriel alongside Elizabeth Esguerra as Rhonda. Days before opening, amidst several rumours it was announced that Esguerra had been removed from the production, with official releases stating "personal reasons", and she was replaced by her first understudy, Stefanie Jones.

Original casts

Musical numbers 

Act 1
"Sunshine State of Mind" – Company
"The Bouquet" – Muriel
"Meet the Heslops" – Perry, Malcolm, Joanie and Betty
"Dancing Queen"† / "The Bouquet" (reprise) – Muriel, Agnetha, Anni-Frid, Benny and Björn
"Progress" – Bill, Deidre and Company
"Can't Hang" – Tania, Cheryl, Nicole and Janine
"Lucky Last/Perry Heslop" – Muriel and Perry 
"Money, Money, Money"† – Agnetha, Anni-Frid, Benny and Björn
"People People" – Tania, Cheryl, Nicole and Janine
"Girls Like Us" – Rhonda and Muriel
"Waterloo"† – Rhonda, Muriel, Agnetha, Anni-Frid, Benny and Björn
"Amazing" – Rhonda and Muriel
"Sydney" – Company
"Any Ordinary Night" – Company
"Strangely Perfect Stranger" – Muriel and Brice
"Any Ordinary Night" – Company

Act 2
"Perry Heslop" (reprise) – Perry
"Here Comes the Bride" – Company
"A True Friend" – Muriel and Rhonda
"Never Stick Your Neck Out" – Brice and Male Company
"Why Can't That Be Me?" – Muriel
"True Friend" (reprise) / "Take a Chance on Ken"  – Rhonda, Muriel, Agnetha, Anni-Frid, Benny and Björn
"Life is a Competition" – Ken and Company
"Mr and Mrs Shkuratov" – Muriel, Alexander, Ken and Company
"Shared, Viral, Linked, Liked" – Tania, Cheryl, Nicole and Janine
"I Do, I Do, I Do, I Do, I Do"† – Tania, Cheryl, Nicole, Muriel, Agnetha, Anni-Frid, Benny and Björn 
"The Bouquet" / "Can't Hang" (reprises) – Company
"SOS"† – Agnetha, Anni-Frid, Benny and Björn
"My Mother (Eulogy)" – Muriel, Perry, Malcolm, Joanie and Company
"Strangely Perfect Stranger" (reprise) – Brice and Muriel
"A True Friend" (reprise) – Company

All songs by Kate Miller-Heidke and Keir Nuttall, except as noted (†): "Dancing Queen", "Waterloo", "I Do, I Do, I Do, I Do, I Do" and "SOS" by Benny Andersson, Björn Ulvaeus and Stig Anderson; "Money, Money, Money" and "Super Trouper" by Benny Andersson and Björn Ulvaeus.

Original cast recording 

The original cast recording was released 12 January 2018 and debuted at #17 on the ARIA Albums Chart in Australia. At the ARIA Music Awards of 2018, the album was nominated for Best Original Soundtrack, Cast or Show Album.

Reception 
Muriel's Wedding received very positive critical responses. The Sydney Morning Herald commented that: "Muriel's Wedding feels like the complete package: a beloved film seamlessly updated; a central character who retains all the ambiguities that made you root for her in the first place; a conspicuously inventive score peppered with classic pop hits, and a mainstage debut that will be talked about for years. Adapting his own screenplay to the stage and into the social media present, PJ Hogan's book amplifies the Cinderella aspects of Muriel's story without sacrificing the satirical and melancholic elements that gave the film its depth and heart."

Awards and nominations
Muriel's Wedding received seven 2017 Sydney Theatre Awards, including Best Production of a Mainstage Musical and Best Original Score of a Mainstage Production, as well as for its direction, choreography, musical direction, Jones as female actor in a supporting role in a musical, and McKenna as newcomer. It was nominated for Best New Australian Work, and in four other categories.

Its text received the 2018 AWGIE Award for Music Theatre, and the AWGIE Awards' David Williamson award for excellence in writing for Australian theatre.

The musical won five 2018 Helpmann Awards including Best Original Score, and was also nominated for Best Musical and Best New Australian Work, amongst others.

At the 2020 Melbourne Green Room Awards, Muriel's Wedding received four Musical Theatre category awards for Original Australian Writing, Choreography, Set Design and Costume Design, and was also nominated for Production, Direction, Lead Role (Abbott), Supporting Role (Jones), and Lighting and Multimedia Design (Trent Suidgeest for the lighting).

Notes 
 While these songs are titled the same, the latter is a reprise.
 This song is retitled on the cast recording as simply "A True Friend".

External links

References 

2017 musicals
ABBA
Australian musicals
Musicals based on films
Plays set in Australia